Across the Badlands is a 1950 American Western film directed by Fred F. Sears and written by Barry Shipman. The film stars Charles Starrett, Smiley Burnette, Helen Mowery, Stanley Andrews, Robert J. Wilke and Dick Elliott. The film was released on September 14, 1950, by Columbia Pictures.

Plot

Cast          
Charles Starrett as Steve Ransom / The Durango Kid
Smiley Burnette as Smiley
Helen Mowery as Eileen Carson
Stanley Andrews as Sheriff Crocker
Robert J. Wilke as Duke Jackson / Keno Jackson
Dick Elliott as Rufus Downey
Hugh Prosser as Jeff Carson
Robert Cavendish as Bart 
Charles Evans as Gregory Banion
Paul Campbell as Pete
Harmonica Bill as Harmonica Bill

References

External links
 

1950 films
American Western (genre) films
1950 Western (genre) films
Columbia Pictures films
Films directed by Fred F. Sears
American black-and-white films
1950s English-language films
1950s American films